Zopa is a British financial services company.

Zopa or ZOPA may also refer to:

 Zone of possible agreement, a business theory term dealing with negotiations
 Thubten Zopa Rinpoche (born 1946), Nepali lama
 Tenzin Zopa (born 1975), Nepalese Tibetan Buddhist monk
 Zopa, an art-rock band fronted by actor Michael Imperioli